Pal (Paulo, Paulo) Gropa was an Albanian feudal ruler of Ohrid and Debar from the 13th century.

Biography
Pal Gropa from Ohrid is known as the lord of Debar. It belongs to the medieval Gropa family. Chroniclers call him "a vassal of the Crown of Naples" ("feudatario della corona di Napoli"). Charles I of Anjou on May 18, 1273 with a gold seal he gave Pal Gropa seven villages in the Devoll valley and other property in Ohrid and Debar vir Sevasto Paulus Gropa ... Serenitati nostre devotius exhibuit casalia Radicis maioris et Radicis minoris, nec non Cobocheste, Zuadigorica, Sirclani et Сraye. Zessizan sitam in valle de Abu“.

In 1275, Sevast Paul Gropa (Ropa) and Johannes Muzaki presented themselves to Vicar General de Tucu in Durrës, a representative of King Charles of Anjou.

Notes

Bibliography 

13th-century births
14th-century deaths
13th-century Albanian people
Gropa family